This article concerns the period 349 BC – 340 BC.

References